Megan Griffith (born September 4, 1985) is an American college basketball coach and current coach of the Columbia Lions women's basketball team. She is the former assistant women's basketball coach and recruiting coordinator at Princeton. During Griffith's time at Princeton, the Tigers reached the postseason each year and earned five Ivy League titles. Since joining Columbia in 2016, Griffith has built up the program and led the Lions to the winningest six-year stretch in the program's NCAA Division I history. The team earned its first Ivy League championship title in 2023.

Biography

Early life and education
Griffith is from King of Prussia, Pennsylvania and was a three-sport athlete at Villa Maria Academy, playing basketball, lacrosse, and volleyball. As a basketball player, she was a two-time team captain and earned first team Main Line Times honors her junior and senior year. Her team won the PIAA District 1 Championship in 2002. Griffith went on to play basketball for the Columbia Lions women's basketball team from 2003 to 2007, captaining the team for three seasons and earning All-Ivy honors in 2006 and 2007. She scored a total of 1,061 career points, making her one of 12 Lions to score more than 1,000 points in her career. She majored in economics and was a two-time Academic All-Ivy selection.

Professional career
After graduation, Griffith played professional basketball in Europe from 2007 to 2010. She was a member of the FoA Nice Basketball team in Forssa, Finland and was named MVP at the end of the 2007–08 season. She played for Espoo from 2008 to 2009 and led the team to the National Finnish Championship and the Finnish Cup Championship titles. During the 2009–10 season, she played for the Celeritas-Donar Basketball team in Groningen, Netherlands.

Head coaching record

References

Living people
1985 births
Columbia Lions women's basketball coaches
Columbia Lions women's basketball players
Basketball coaches from Pennsylvania
People from Upper Merion Township, Pennsylvania